The 1934 Winter 100 was a motor race held at the Phillip Island circuit, near Cowes on Phillip Island, in Victoria, Australia on 4 June 1934.
The race, which was organised by the Light Car Club of Australia, was staged over 15 laps, a total distance of 100 miles.
It was contested on a handicap basis with the first car scheduled to start 17 minutes 30 seconds before the Scratch car.

The race was won by Les Jennings driving an MG Magna from a handicap of 10 minutes 45 seconds.

Results

Notes
 Entries: 21
 Starters: 15
 Finishers: 8
 Official race time: 1h 20m 46s
 Winner's average speed: 74.2 mph
 Fastest Time: L. Jennings (MG Magna)

References

External links
 WINTER "100" - Race at Cowes - Handicaps Announced, The Argus, Tuesday 29 May 1934, Page 11, as archived at trove.nla.gov.au
 WINTER 100 MILES RACE - THRILLS AT PHILLIP ISLAND - L. Jennings Winner and Fastest, The Argus, Tuesday 5 June 1934, Page 5, as archived at trove.nla.gov.au

Motorsport at Phillip Island
Winter 100